Bazmak-e Olya (also Romanized as Bazmak-e ‘Olyā; also known as Bazmak, Bazmak-e Bālā, Bezmak, and Bīzmak) is a village in Sornabad Rural District, Hamaijan District, Sepidan County, Fars Province, Iran. At the 2006 census, its population was 24, in 7 families.

References 

Populated places in Sepidan County